Livadotopi (before 1928: Όμοτσκο - Omotsko) is a village in Kastoria Regional Unit, Macedonia, Greece.

In 1923, there were 6 Muslim families (30 people) in Omotsko.

References

Populated places in Kastoria (regional unit)